Acalolepta basimaculata is a species of beetle in the family Cerambycidae. It was described by Pic in 1944. It is known from Vietnam.

References

Acalolepta
Beetles described in 1944